Ellen Mabel Liederskron Babington (12 June 1877 – 10 September 1956) was a British archer.  She competed at the 1908 Summer Olympics in London. Babington competed at the 1908 Games in the only archery event open to women, the double National round.  She took 18th place in the event with 451 points.

References

External links
 
 
 Ellen Babington's profile at Sports Reference.com

1877 births
1956 deaths
Archers at the 1908 Summer Olympics
Olympic archers of Great Britain
British female archers
Ellen
20th-century British women